The 2008 congressional elections in Utah were held on November 4, 2008 to determine the representatives of the state of Utah in the United States House of Representatives for the 111th Congress from January 3, 2009, until their terms of office expire on January 3, 2011. Incumbent Rob Bishop (R) was reelected in Utah's 1st congressional district. Incumbent Jim Matheson (D) was reelected in Utah's 2nd congressional district. Jason Chaffetz (R) was elected to succeed Chris Cannon (R) in Utah's 3rd congressional district.

Utah has three seats in the House, apportioned according to the 2000 United States Census. Representatives are elected for two-year terms. The election coincided with the 2008 U.S. presidential election.

All races were forecasted as safe for the incumbent party.

District 1

This district covers the northwest area of Utah including Ogden, Logan, Tooele, the northwest portion of Salt Lake City, and the entirety of the Great Salt Lake. It has been represented by Republican Rob Bishop since January 2003. His challengers were Democrat Morgan Bowen, Libertarian Joseph Geddes Buchman, and Constitution candidate Kirk D. Pearson. CQ Politics forecast the race as 'Safe Republican'.

District 2

 
This district covers the largely rural southern and eastern portions of Utah (including Saint George and Moab in the south and Vernal in the east), as well as the east side of urban Salt Lake County, the northern portion of Utah County, and Wasatch County. It has been represented by Democrat Jim Matheson since 2001. His challengers were Republican Bill Dew, Libertarian Mathew Arndt and Independent Dennis Ray Emery. CQ Politics forecasted the race as 'Safe Democrat'.

District 3

This district covers central and west central Utah, including nearly all of Utah County and the west side of Salt Lake County. It has been represented by Republican Chris Cannon since 1997, who lost to Jason Chaffetz in the primary. His challengers were Democrat Bennion Spencer and Constitution Party Candidate Jim Noorlander. CQ Politics forecasted the race as 'Safe Republican'.

See also
United States House of Representatives elections, 2008

References

External links
State of Utah Elections

Campaign contributions for Utah congressional races from OpenSecrets
2008 Utah General Election graph of multiple polls from Pollster.com

2008
Utah
United States House of Representatives